Moorside is part of the Bramley area of Leeds, West Yorkshire, England. Moorside falls within the Bramley and Stanningley ward of the Leeds Metropolitan Council.

See also
Listed buildings in Leeds (Bramley and Stanningley Ward)

References

External links
 Historical and genealogical resource for area including Moorside

Places in Leeds